Taricharkalan is a town and a nagar panchayat in Tikamgarh district in the Indian state of Madhya Pradesh.

Demographics
 India census, Taricharkalan had a population of 6,440. Males constitute 54% of the population and females 46%. Taricharkalan has an average literacy rate of 57%, lower than the national average of 59.5%: male literacy is 67%, and female literacy is 45%. In Taricharkalan, 17% of the population is under 6 years of age.

References

Cities and towns in Tikamgarh district